September 000 is the first EP by the American rock band The Secret Machines.

Critical reception
The Quietus wrote that the EP is "a great reminder of just how great long-winded, bong-addled, stoner rock can be in the right hands." Trouser Press, on the other hand, considered it an "excruciating bore."

Track listing
"Marconi's Radio" – 7:42
"What Used to Be French" – 6:30
"Breathe" – 2:43
"Still See You" – 2:49
"It's a Bad Wind That Don't Blow Somebody Some Good" – 5:56
"Marconi's Radio (Again)" – 2:46

Personnel
Brandon Curtis – vocals, bass guitar, keyboard
Benjamin Curtis (musician) – guitar, backing vocals
Josh Garza – drums
 Brian Deck - Marimba, electronics, percussion & distorted organ
 Ben Massarella- Percussion
 Tim Rutili - Slide & Acoustic Guitar
 Gillian Lisee - additional percussion

References

Secret Machines albums
2002 debut EPs
Ace Fu Records EPs